Wangath Temple complex is a group of Hindu temple monuments in Wangath, close to Naranag, in the Ganderbal district of the Kashmir Valley of Jammu and Kashmir, India. The current structure was built by Lalitaditya Muktapida of the Karkota dynasty in the 8th century CE.

History

Kalhana notes in Rajatarangini that Ashoka built the city of Srinagar in the 3rd century BCE. His son Jaluka, 220 BCE, built the Shaivite temples Bhuteshvara, Jyestarudra, and Muthas in the Wangath valley around the holy spring of Naranag. The Wangath temples were built in three groups, around the same time as the Shankaracharya Temple in Srinagari and the Bumazuv temple near Mattan. King Jaluka built a stone temple at the site of the spring Naranag around 137 BCE. King Jayendra (61 BCE) used to worship Shiva Bhutesha at the shrine. Lalitaditya Muktapida (713–735 CE) donated a good sum of money to the shrine after his victorious expedition. King Avantivarman (855–883 CE) built a stone pedestal with a silver conduit at this shrine for the bathing of sacred images. Kalhana's father Canpaka and uncle Kanka also frequented the site.

As per Kalhana, the treasury of this shrine was plundered by King Sangramraja of Kashmir (1003–28 CE), during King Uccala's time (1101–1111 CE) and later by the rebel baron Hayavadana.

Architecture and style 

Bishop Crowie and Major Cole have identified the ruins of seventeen temple structures of various ages and dimensions in Buthser, near Wangath, in two distinct groups: the first on the western side and the second on the eastern side. Each group is enclosed by a separate stone wall, and lie a short distance from one another. The temple complex is located along the Kanka nadi or the Kanaknai and is constructed of local grey granite. Between the two groups of temples stand a number of structures of a third group, the Mathas.

Western complex 
The first group of six temples, also identified by Aurel Stein as Shiva-Jyestharudra or Shiva-Jyeshthesa, is situated within an enclosure wall. The Jyestharudra group is placed on high grounds and consists of a main temple of Jyeshthesa (Shiva) surrounded by subsidiary shrines. The principal structure is a square of  externally and  internally, and has two entrances opposite each other, facing the northeast and southwest. In the center of the floor is a square space which is unpaved. It marks the site of the pedestal of the image. Internally, it has a domed ceiling. Externally, the roof is pyramidal.

Eastern complex 
The second group of temples is enclosed in a massive rectangular stone wall, pierced by a two-chambered gateway. The six temples inside the wall are in ruins and are partly buried in the ground. The largest temple has a  square base internally, similar to the largest temple in the western complex. This temple has been identified by Stein as Shiva-Bhuteshwara.

Central pavilion 
Between the western and eastern complexes lie a number of structures of a third group. This was a pillared pavilion or matha. An impressive  rectangular cistern, hammered out of a boulder, is nearby.

Present status

Site of national importance
The Archaeological Survey of India has declared the Wangath Temple complex at Naranag as centrally protected monuments of India. The temple appears in the list of "centrally protected monuments" as "Group of Ancient Temples" at Naranag, Kangan.

References

Hindu temples in Jammu and Kashmir
Destroyed temples
Archaeological sites in Jammu and Kashmir
Tourist attractions in India
Shiva temples in Jammu and Kashmir
2nd-century BC Hindu temples
7th-century Hindu temples
Ganderbal district